is a passenger railway station  located in the town of Yazu, Yazu District, Tottori Prefecture, Japan.. It is operated by the West Japan Railway Company (JR West).

Lines
Only local trains stop at this station.

Station layout
The station consists of one ground-level side platform serving a single bi-directional track.  There is no station building, and a waiting area is placed on the platform.The station is unattended.

History
Higashi-Kōge Station opened on November 1, 1956.  With the privatization of the Japan National Railways (JNR) on April 1, 1987, the station came under the aegis of the West Japan Railway Company.

Passenger statistics
In fiscal 2018, the station was used by an average of 148 passengers daily.

Surrounding area
Yazu Town Gunge East Elementary School
Japan National Route 29

See also
List of railway stations in Japan

References

External links 

 Higashi-Kōge Station from JR-Odekake.net 

Railway stations in Tottori Prefecture
Railway stations in Japan opened in 1956
Yazu, Tottori